Minimi can refer to:

 FN Minimi, a belt-fed light machine gun
 Minims (religious order), a religious order known as the Minimi (Minims, Order of the Minims)
 Abductor digiti minimi muscle of hand, a muscle in the hand
 Abductor digiti minimi muscle of foot, a muscle in the foot

See also
 Minim (disambiguation)
 Minime (disambiguation)